Manistee is a city in the U.S. state of Michigan. Located in southwestern Manistee County, it is part of the northwestern Lower Peninsula. Manistee is the county seat of Manistee County, and its population was 6,259 at the 2020 census. This makes Manistee the fifth-largest city in Northern Michigan.

Manistee is located on an isthmus between Manistee Lake and Lake Michigan, with the Manistee River bisecting the city as it flows west to the latter. Many smaller communities surround Manistee, such as Eastlake, Filer City, Oak Hill, Parkdale, and Stronach. Also bordering Manistee are the townships of Filer, Manistee, and Stronach. Manistee is also the location of the junction of US 31 and M-55, two major state trunkline highways.

History

In 1751, a Jesuit Mission was established in Manistee. Missionaries visited Manistee in the early 19th century, and a Jesuit mission house is known to have been located on the NW shore of Manistee Lake in 1826. In 1832, a group of traders from Massachusetts built a log house up the Manistee River. However, they were soon driven off by the Odawa nation. The first white settlement and sawmill was built there in 1841.

In 1830 the village of Manistee was one of about 15 Odawa (Ottawa) villages along the shore of Lake Michigan.  Much of the Manistee River Valley, including Manistee itself, was designated as an Odawa Reservation from 1836 to 1848.

The first permanent Euro-American settlement was made on April 16, 1841, when John Stronach and his son, Adam Stronach, arrived at the mouth of the Manistee River in a schooner loaded with fifteen men and equipment, and established a saw mill.

In 1846, the town was named "Manistee"; it was made part of Ottawa County, whose county offices were 100 miles away at Grand Haven. After a series of new counties were organized, by 1855 Manistee was part of a large Manistee county that also included modern-day Manistee, Wexford, and Missaukee counties. Thomas Jefferson Ramsdell, Manistee's first lawyer, moved there in 1860 and remained there until his death. Ramsdell owned the first hardware store in the city, and was responsible for the construction of a bridge across the Manistee River.

On October 8, 1871, the town was practically destroyed by fire; on the same day that the Peshtigo Fire, the Great Chicago Fire, and fires in Port Huron and Holland occurred, the Great Michigan Fire burned Manistee. Manistee was incorporated as a city in 1882.

21st century to present
In 2000, Manistee made national headlines after a local jury convicted a woman for expressing to her mother near a Hispanic family in a restaurant her wish that immigrants would learn English; the judge described it as "insulting conduct" consisting of "fighting words", an offense that was punishable under a local ordinance.  Allegations appeared of improper procedure and irregularities in the court records.  Two years later (November 1, 2002) and after the defendant spent four nights in jail, the conviction was overturned by the state Court of Appeals.

Etymology 
The name "Manistee" is from an Ojibwe word first applied to the principal river of the county. The derivation is not certain, but it may be from ministigweyaa, "river with islands at its mouth".  Other sources claim that it was an Ojibwe term meaning "spirit of the woods".

Geography
 At the mouth of the Manistee River is the Manistee Pierhead lights (north and south piers) that were built in 1873, and replaced in 1927.
 Manistee is considered to be part of Northern Michigan.

Climate

Demographics

2010 census
As of the census of 2010, there were 6,226 people, 2,816 households, and 1,614 families residing in the city. The population as of 2013 is 6117. The racial makeup of the city was 91.5% White, 0.5% African American, 3.8% Native American, 0.4% Asian, 0.7% from other races, and 3.0% from two or more races. Hispanic or Latino of any race were 3.4% of the population.

There were 2,816 households, of which 26.2% had children under the age of 18 living with them, 39.1% were married couples living together, 13.4% had a female householder with no husband present, 4.9% had a male householder with no wife present, and 42.7% were non-families. 36.4% of all households were made up of individuals, and 14.7% had someone living alone who was 65 years of age or older. The average household size was 2.18 and the average family size was 2.82.

The median age in the city was 43.6 years. 21.9% of residents were under the age of 18; 8% were between the ages of 18 and 24; 21.9% were from 25 to 44; 30.1% were from 45 to 64; and 18% were 65 years of age or older. The gender makeup of the city was 48.5% male and 51.5% female.

2000 census
As of the census of 2000, there were 6,586 people, 2,912 households, and 1,729 families residing in the city. The racial makeup of the city was 94.9% White, 0.3% African American, 1.4% Native American, 0.5% Asian, nil% Pacific Islander, 1.0% from other races, and 1.9% from two or more races. Hispanic or Latino of any race were 2.2% of the population.

There were 2,912 households, out of which 27.5% had children under the age of 18 living with them, 42.8% were married couples living together, 12.3% had a female householder with no husband present, and 40.6% were non-families. 35.1% of all households were made up of individuals, and 17.8% had someone living alone who was 65 years of age or older.  The average household size was 2.24 and the average family size was 2.88.

In the city, the age distribution of the population shows 24.0% under the age of 18, 7.3% from 18 to 24, 26.2% from 25 to 44, 23.1% from 45 to 64, and 19.4% who were 65 years of age or older.  The median age was 40 years. For every 100 females, there were 86.9 males.  For every 100 females age 18 and over, there were 81.3 males.

The median income for a household in the city was $30,351, and the median income for a family was $41,816. Males had a median income of $35,347 versus $20,102 for females. The per capita income for the city was $16,810.  About 6.9% of families and 11.1% of the population were below the poverty line, including 13.2% of those under age 18 and 8.6% of those age 65 or over.

Industry
In its heyday, Manistee was home to a booming logging industry.

In the late 19th century, Manistee was one of the leading shingle manufacturing cities in the world, with over 30 shingle mills on the Manistee river at one time. During the lumber boom of the 1880s, Manistee was the headquarters of its own railroad, the Manistee and North-Eastern, and had more millionaires per capita than anywhere else in the United States.

Manistee is also associated with the salt industry.  Manistee is now the home of three factories on Lake Manistee; Packaging Corporation of America, Morton Salt, and Martin Marietta. For this reason, Manistee is known as the "Salt City". The town is also a local favorite for tourism and fishing.

Media
Manistee is home to a radio station, WMTE-FM (101.5), and was previously home to the now-defunct WMTE (1340 AM). The Ludington Daily News, Manistee News Advocate and Traverse City Record-Eagle cover the Manistee area and distribute daily newspapers in the city.

Formerly distributing newspapers in Manistee included the Bear Lake Beacon, the Copemish Courier, the Manistee Advocate, the Manistee Daily Advocate (which became the Manistee News Advocate), the Manistee Daily News, the Manistee Democrat, and the Onekama Lake Breeze.

Movies

Manistee is home to 10 West Studios which produces full-length motion pictures. Notable movies include: What If..., starring Kevin Sorbo and John Ratzenberger filmed in Manistee, Jerusalem Countdown featuring Randy Travis, Stacy Keach and Lee Majors, Mickey Matson and the Copperhead Conspiracy starring Christopher Lloyd and Ernie Hudson, and God Bless the Broken Road starring Jordin Sparks and Lindsay Pulsipher

Area activities
 Orchard Beach State Park is approximately 2 miles North of Manistee.
 Little River Casino Resort is approximately 5 miles North-East of Manistee.
 Manistee National Golf Resort is approximately 2 miles South of Manistee.
 Manistee Golf and Country Club was established in 1901 and is located within the city of Manistee.
 There are three public beaches, Fifth Avenue Beach with the small man-made lake next to Fifth Avenue Beach and First Street Beach, located respectively north and south of the harbor entrance on the shore of Lake Michigan.

Local events and attractions
Manistee has museums, an opera house, and recurring events.
These include:

 Arcadia Area Historical Museum
 Armory Youth Project 
 Brethren Heritage Museum
 Kaleva Bottle House Museum also known as the John J. Makinen Bottle House
 Kaleva Train Depot Museum
 Lake Bluff Bird Sanctuary (Michigan Audubon Society)
 Manistee Art Institute 
 Manistee County Historical Museum
 Manistee Fire Hall
 Manistee National Forest Festival
 Marilla Historical Museum
 Our Savior's Historical Museum
 Ramsdell Theatre, home to the Manistee Civic Players. and the Manistee Art Institute.
 Riverwalk,  of Victoriana and scenic river views.
 Page Road
 , a National Historic Landmark
 Victorian Manistee Tours
 Victorian Sleighbell Parade and Old Christmas Weekend
 Historic Vogue Theatre built in 1938, having Art Deco/Art Moderne design elements, and considered to be notable.
 Waterworks Building

Retail
Manistee has a historic downtown with many original buildings from the Victorian era. The entire Downtown District is listed on the National Register of Historic Places.  There are a good variety of retail stores in Manistee, many of which are locally owned and operated.

Government and infrastructure
The Michigan Department of Corrections Oaks Correctional Facility is in Manistee Township, near Manistee.

Recreation
 Over 40 charter fishing boats operate on Lake Michigan from Manistee County ports.
 Fishing in the Manistee River can yield salmon and steelhead.
 Because a large portion of the county is public land, hunting is popular.
 Filmmaker Michael Moore visited Manistee in February 2011 to support the restoration of the Vogue Theatre in downtown Manistee.

Sports
The Manistee Saints are a semi-professional baseball team that have called Manistee home since 1934. Their home games are at Rietz Park in Manistee. Formerly, the Manistee Colts and the Manistee Champs played in the Michigan State League, a minor league baseball league.

There are many golf courses located around the city of Manistee.
 Manistee National Golf and Resort
 Manistee Country Club
 Fox Hills Golf Course
 Bear Lake County Highlands
 Fawn Crest Golf Course
 Arcadia Bluffs Golf Course
 Crystal Mountain
 Caberfae Peaks Ski & Golf Resort
There are also two ski resorts near the city of Manistee.
 Crystal Mountain (30 miles North)
 Caberfae Peaks Ski & Golf Resort (36 miles East)
There are many disc golf courses, mountain biking trails, and hiking trails all over Manistee County and in the city of Manistee.

Schools

Currently operating
Elementary
 James Madison Elementary (DayCare, Pre-School, K), Manistee Area Public Schools
 Thomas Jefferson Elementary (1-2), Manistee Area Public Schools
 Trinity Lutheran School (K-8), Lutheran Church – Missouri Synod Private School
Secondary
 Casman Alternative Academy (7-12), Provides an alternative education for those in Manistee County and surrounding areas.
 Manistee Middle/High School (6-12), Manistee Area Public Schools, Class B/Division 3 ; Division 5 (Football) in sports

All grades
 Manistee Catholic Central School (K-12), Roman Catholic private school, Class D/Division 4 ; Division 8 (Football)

Temporary closed for maintenance
Elementary
 John F. Kennedy Elementary (Location of Former Middle School) (3-5), Manistee Area Public Schools

Formerly operating
Elementary
 George Washington Elementary (K-6), Manistee Area Public Schools
 Abraham Lincoln Elementary (K-6), Manistee Area Public Schools
 John F. Kennedy Elementary (Parkdale Location) (4-6), Manistee Area Public Schools
Secondary
 Guardian Angels Schools (7-12), Catholic Church School
 St. Joseph Schools (K-12), Catholic Church School
 Newland Academy (6-12), School (Type Unknown) (formerly "Lake Bluff Academy")
Unknown
 Tomaszewski Country School (K-8), School (One Room Country School)Closed 1959/60 Students moved to Parkdale School
 Union School (?-?), School (Type Unknown)
 Woodrow Wilson Elementary (?-?), Manistee Area Public Schools

Transportation
Since May 2012, Cape Air offers non-stop scheduled flights  to and from Chicago Midway International Airport.
  traverses the heart of Manistee, running southerly toward Scottville and Muskegon and northerly toward Bear Lake and Traverse City.
  is a former state trunkline that used to run from US 31 on the city line of Manistee and Parkdale within Manistee Township to Orchard State Park. It was decommissioned in 2003.

Notable people
 Dave Campbell, baseball player and sportscaster
 Byron M. Cutcheon, Civil War veteran and winner of the Medal of Honor, Congressman, attorney, and postmaster
 Fred W. Green, Governor of Michigan, 1927–1931
 Nels Johnson and his business of Century tower clocks
 James Earl Jones, actor, first began acting at the Ramsdell Theatre in Manistee
 Edward Kozlowski, Polish-American priest, later Bishop of Milwaukee
 Michael J. Malik Sr., developer
 Harry W. Musselwhite, politician and newspaper publisher
 Harriet Quimby, first licensed American woman aviator, was born in nearby Arcadia Township
 Rasmus Rasmussen (merchant), lumberman and merchant
 Olaf Swenson, fur trader, adventurer, and author
 George W. Tennant, cook, Antarctic explorer
 Toni Trucks,  actor, first began acting at the Ramsdell Theatre in Manistee
 Robert Pershing Wadlow, the world's tallest man in medical history died at the Hotel Chippewa in Manistee on July 15, 1940.

See also

 House of Flavors
 Manistee Watch Company

References

Further reading
 Clarke Historical Library, Central Michigan University, Bibliography for Manistee County.
 Shannon McRae, Images of America: Manistee County (2003)
 Curran N. Russell and Dona Degen Baer, The Lumberman's Legacy (1954)

External links

 City of Manistee Official Site
 Manistee County convention and business bureau, with links to local events and attractions
 

Cities in Manistee County, Michigan
County seats in Michigan
Michigan populated places on Lake Michigan
Populated places established in 1841
1841 establishments in Michigan
Michigan placenames of Native American origin